The following highways are numbered 710:

Costa Rica
 National Route 710

United States